Bharatisiren is an extinct genus of mammal which existed in what is now India during the early Miocene (Aquitanian) period.

Taxonomy
The type species of Bharatisiren, B. kachchhebsis, was originally named as a species of Metaxytherium, M. kachchhebsis, by Bajpai et al. (1987) from the Aquitanian-age Khari Nadi Formation of western India. Bajpai and Domning (1997). however, judged M. kachchhensis generically distinct enough from the Metaxytherium type species to warrant its own genus, Bharatisiren.

References

Miocene sirenians
Fossil taxa described in 1997
Extinct animals of India
Prehistoric placental genera